There have twice been conflicts regarding the hosting duties of NBC's The Tonight Show

 1992 Tonight Show conflict, between Jay Leno and David Letterman
 2010 Tonight Show conflict, between Jay Leno and Conan O'Brien

See also

 Jay Leno
 David Letterman
 Conan O'Brien
 Late Night with David Letterman
 Late Night with Conan O'Brien
 The Tonight Show with Jay Leno
 The Tonight Show with Conan O'Brien
 Late Show with David Letterman
 Conan (talk show)